The BTC-T Peugeot 307 is a BTC-Touring class racing car that was built for the 2003 British Touring Car Championship season by Vic Lee Racing.

Team Halfords
After two unsuccessful seasons of running the BTC-T Peugeot 406 Coupe, Team Halfords took the decision to switch to the Peugeot 307. Designed by renowned Formula One designer Sergio Rinland, the 307 was the second BTC Touring spec car built by the Coventry-based firm. Two cars were built, and both appeared for the first rounds of 2003 at Mondello Park, initially driven by Dan Eaves and Carl Breeze, although Breeze was replaced by Daniel Buxton halfway through the season. The 307 struggled at the start of the season, but became slightly more competitive as the season went on, Eaves eventually finishing 4th in the Independents championship. However, in 2004, Eaves moved to Team Dynamics, taking the Halfords sponsorship with him.

Later career
Initially unused in 2004, one of the cars was used by Richard Marsh in round 8 and 9, after struggling in a Super 2000-spec Honda Civic. The car did not reappear again in 2005, but in 2006, Marsh once again drove the car, this time for Team Farécla in the last 4 rounds of the championship. Marsh was plagued by problems in the underdeveloped 307, suffering many mechanical issues that prevented him from finishing races, or even starting them. The car did not appear again in 2007.

Chassis History
Car 1
2003 - Dan Eaves
2004 - Richard Marsh | Marsh: Rounds 21-27
2006 - Richard Marsh | Marsh: Rounds 16-24/28-30
2008 - Nick Beaumont/Mark Clynes - Britcar Production S1

Car 2
2003 - Carl Breeze/Daniel Buxton | Breeze: Rounds 1-10, Buxton: Rounds 11-20
2004 onwards - Hillclimbing and sprinting
2007 onwards - Peugeot Ecosse trackday car

References

British Touring Car Championship
Touring cars
307 BTC-T
Cars introduced in 2003
Front-wheel-drive vehicles